Adolph Rickenbacker (April 1, 1887 – March 21, 1976) was a Swiss-American production engineer and machinist who, together with George Beauchamp, created the first electric string instrument, and  co-founded the Rickenbacker guitar company with George Beauchamp. 

Rickenbacker was born in Basel, Switzerland as Adolf Rickenbacher. He immigrated in 1891 to the United States with older relatives after his parents died, settling in Columbus Ohio and later southern California. He Anglicized both his own name, and that of his company's brand, to Rickenbacker to capitalize on the popularity of his distant cousin, America's top flying ace Eddie Rickenbacker. The World War I ace himself had felt pressure to change the spelling of his name because of the wave of anti-German sentiment caused by the war, in an effort to "take the Hun out of his name." Eddie was already well known at the time, so the change received wide publicity. "From then on", as he wrote in his autobiography, "most Rickenbachers were practically forced to spell their name in the way I had..."

Rickenbacher manufacturing Company produced parts for the National String Instrument Corporation, manufacturer of John Dopyera's Resonator guitars. Of particular importance was his ability to form guitar bodies with one of the largest deep drawing presses available. Rickenbacker held the title of Engineer at National. In October, 1931 he joined George Beauchamp and Paul Barth in the creation of Ro-Pat-In (ElectRo-Patent-Instruments), later renamed Electro String, the producer of guitars under the brand name Rickenbacker. Rickenbacker who was a significant investor in the guitar businesses was given the title of president, Paul Barth vice president, and George Beauchamp secretary-treasurer.

In 1934 he, along with George Beauchamp, filed a patent application for an "electrical stringed musical instrument". They received the patent in 1937 and developed an electric guitar for the mass market.

Adolph Rickenbacker died from cancer in Orange County, California in 1976 at the age of 88.

References

External links
 Early history of Rickenbacher/Electro String, from the Rickenbacker website

1880s births
1976 deaths
People from Basel-Stadt
American people of Swiss-German descent
Businesspeople from Columbus, Ohio
Writers from Columbus, Ohio
Swiss emigrants to the United States
American luthiers
Deaths from cancer in California
20th-century American businesspeople